Frederick Robert Crane (10 July 1942 – 6 April 2013) was a cricketer who played first-class cricket for Queensland from 1965 to 1968.

Bob Crane was born in Mullumbimby in northern New South Wales and educated at Lismore High School before going to the University of Queensland to study engineering. A left-handed batsman, right-arm off-spin bowler and exceptional slips fieldsman, he played for the University team in the Brisbane Grade Cricket competition for 16 years, captaining the side for three seasons.

Crane played three seasons of Sheffield Shield cricket with Queensland. He made his highest score in his first match, when he was the only Queensland batsman to resist the New South Wales spin bowlers in the second innings, making 98 out of the team's total of 178. His best bowling figures were 5 for 42 against South Australia in 1967-68, when he also opened the batting and made 60 (Queensland's top score for the match) and 25.

Crane worked as a consulting engineer, mostly in Queensland. He died in Brisbane of pancreatic cancer aged 70.

References

External links
 
 Bob Crane at CricketArchive

1942 births
2013 deaths
Australian cricketers
Queensland cricketers
University of Queensland alumni
Deaths from cancer in Queensland
Deaths from pancreatic cancer